Habibullah Kalakani (19 January 1891 – 1 November 1929), derided by Pashtun as "Bacha-ye Saqao" (also romanized Bachai Sakao; literally son of the water carrier) was the ruler of Afghanistan from 17 January to 13 October 1929, as well as a leader of the Saqqawists. During the Afghan Civil War, he captured vast swathes of Afghanistan and ruled Kabul during what is known in Afghan historiography as the "Saqqawist period". He was an ethnic Tajik. No country recognized Kalakani as ruler of Afghanistan.

During the Afghan Civil War (1928–1929), he contested the Afghan throne with Amanullah Khan. After defeating Amanullah, he was eventually defeated by Mohammed Nadir Shah. Khalilullah Khalili, a Kohistani poet laureate, depicted King Habibullah Kalakani as the "best manager of governmental imports and exports".

Early years 
Habibullah Kalakani was born in either 1891 or 1870 in the village of Kalakan, north of Kabul. He was an ethnic Tajik. In his memoirs, Kalakani stated that his home village was "miserable" and that he had "conceived a deep hatred of its poverty-stricken exterior". At age 14, he left for Kabul on horseback with his friends Nur and Jamal.  Later, he joined King Amanullah Khan's army, and fought in the Third Anglo-Afghan War and the Khost rebellion of 1924. During the latter war, he served as officer with the Royal Army's "Model Battalion" and served with distinction during the suppression of the insurgents. Nevertheless, he deserted the unit at some unspecified time, and after working in Peshawar moved to Parachinar where he was arrested and sentenced to eleven months of imprisonment by the British.

Kalakani began a life of banditry, since he considered the occupations common among the Kuhdamanis, like viticulture and selling firewood, to be beneath him, reasoning that these could hardly ever provide wheat bread for his table. Instead, he began to rob caravans and nearby villages. He was joined by  Sayyid Husayn and Malik Muhsin, as well as others, totaling 24 in all. For three years, they lived in mountain caves, venturing  out during the day to rob and hiding out at night, all the time fearful of government retaliation. Sometime later, Kalakani fled to Peshawar where he was a tea seller and a petty thief.

The word "bandits" derived from "Basmachi", which the Soviets used to refer to their opponents in Central Asia, since Habibullah Kalakani supported Ibrahim Bek Lakay, in his fight against the Soviets in Dushanbe and he was a part of the resistance movement (Basmachi) against Bolsheviks, therefore the Soviets called him and his comrades Basmachi meaning "bandits". 

After British police arrested and jailed an accomplice of his, he fled to Peshawar where he stayed a while, supporting himself by petty theft. Kalakani and his bandit group also murdered Ghulam Ghaws Khan, Governor of Charikar.

Revolt 

While the Afghan National Army was engulfed in battle with Pashtun outlaw tribes in Laghman and Nangarhar in the east of the country, the Saqqawists, led by Kalakani began to attack the unprotected Kabul from the north in 1928. The revolt caught steam and the country was thrown into a civil war. Wild tribesmen from Waziristan had the southern areas of Kabul surrounded, and Kalakāni's forces were moving into the heart of Kabul from the north.

In the middle of the night, on 14 January 1929, Amanullah Khan handed over his kingdom to his brother Inayatullah Khan and escaped from Kabul towards Kandahar in the south, fearing people's wrath. Two days later, on 16 January 1929, Kalakani wrote a letter to King Inayatullah Khan to either surrender or prepare to fight. Inayatullah Khan responded by explaining that he never wished to become king, and agreed to abdicate.

Kingship 

The powerful Pashtun tribes, including the Ghilzai, who had initially supported him against Amanullah, chafed under rule by a non-Pashtun. When Amanullah's last feeble attempt to regain his throne failed, those next in line were the Musahiban brothers. They were also from the Mohammedzai and Barakzai family trees, and their great-grandfather was an older brother of Dost Mohammad.

The five prominent Musahiban brothers included Nadir Shah, the eldest, who had been Amānullāh's minister of war. They were permitted to cross through the Khyber Pakhtunkhwa to enter Afghanistan and take up arms. Once on the other side, however, they were not allowed back and forth across the border to use British-Indian territory as a sanctuary, nor were they allowed to gather together a tribal army on the British side of the Durand Line. However, the Musahiban brothers and the tribes successfully ignored these restrictions.

During this period anti-Soviet rebels from Central Asia known as Basmachi utilized the period  of instability in Afghanistan to launch raids into the Soviet Union. The Basmachi had taken refuge in Afghanistan earlier in the decade after they were expelled from Soviet Central Asia by the Soviet military and they swore allegiance to the Emir of Bukhara, who lived in exile in Kabul. One of these raids was led by Faizal Maksum, who operated under the command of Basmachi commander Ibrahim Bek. Faizal Maksum's forces briefly captured the town of Gharm until they were expelled by Soviet forces. The Basmachi operated in Afghanistan due to their alliance with Habibullah Ghazi and after his fall from power they were expelled from Afghanistan.

Death 
After several unsuccessful attempts, Nadir and his brothers finally raised a sufficiently large force—mostly from the British side of the Durand Line—to take Kabul on 13 October 1929. Nadir considered pardoning Kalakani, but pressure from loyal tribes led him to execute Kalakani on 1 November 1929. Kalakani's last words prior to being executed were "I have nothing to ask God, he has given me everything I desired. God has made me King."

His remains were laid below a hilltop mausoleum at an undisclosed location for 87 years, until a campaign in 2016 by some Tajiks and scholars who wanted him to be reburied in a better place. This caused days of political and slight sectarian tensions in Kabul - Tajiks and religious scholars, who consider Kalakani to have been a devout Muslim, wanted him to be buried at the Shahrara hill and asked President Ashraf Ghani to plan a state burial. Opponents of Kalakani, mostly Pashtuns and secularists, were against this plan, including vice-president Abdul Rashid Dostum who claimed that he could not be buried at a hilltop important to Uzbek heritage. He was eventually buried at the hill on 2 September 2016, with one death and four injuries occurring in clashes between his supporters and pro-Dostum soldiers.

Notes

Further reading 

  - An autobiography of Habibullah Kalakani.

See also 
 Afghan Civil War (1928–1929)

References

External links 

1891 births
1929 deaths
20th-century Afghan monarchs
Kings of Afghanistan
Usurpers
Ethnic Tajik people
Afghan Tajik people
People executed by Afghanistan by firing squad
1929 in Afghanistan
20th-century Afghan politicians
20th-century executions by Afghanistan
Executed monarchs
Executed Afghan people
Afghan Civil War (1928–1929)